Thomaz Bellucci was the defending champion, however he chose not to participate.

Pablo Cuevas won the title, defeating Hugo Dellien in the final, 6–2, 6–4.

Seeds

Draw

Finals

Top half

Bottom half

References
 Main Draw
 Qualifying Draw

2014 ATP Challenger Tour
2014 Singles